António Luiz Patrício da Silva Manso (1788–1848) was a Brazilian botanist, physician, and politician.

Silva Manso was born in Campinas, Brazil. Silva Manso was an expert on spermatophytes and the first person to classify the genus Cayaponia and the species Cayaponia espelina. He named the genus Cayaponia after the indigenous Cayapo people of Brazil. A genus of climbing shrubs, Mansoa, is named after him. He began work as a painter, as his father was a painter. He began studying botany in 1819 and became a licensed physician in 1820. He was also a member of the Brazilian General Assembly from 1834 to 1837.

He became involved in the Brazilian struggle for independence, which led to his murder in January 1848.

References 

19th-century Brazilian botanists
People from Campinas
1788 births
1848 deaths
19th-century Brazilian physicians